Peltigera praetextata, or the scaly dog pelt lichen, is a foliose lichen native to North America, Europe, and Asia. It is defined by small belly-button-like growths called phyllidia on its edges and centre.

Characteristics
It is dark green when wet, often with a reddish centre, and greyish when dry. It is tomentous, or covered with fine hairs. It does not reproduce vegetatively using isidia or soredia like most lichens, but using phyllidia. It is often fertile as well, with round to saddle-shaped red apothecial discs.

Ecology
Although often found over moss or tree bark, P. praetextata may also be found on bare soil. It is common throughout temperate and boreal ecosystems.

References

praetextata
Lichen species
Lichens described in 1826
Lichens of North America
Lichens of Europe
Lichens of Asia